Rosland Capital is a precious metals asset management firm that sells gold and other precious metals in physical form. The company is headquartered in Los Angeles, California and is widely known for its television commercials starring actor William Devane.

Background
Marin Aleksov founded the company in 2008 and serves as CEO. The company specializes in selling gold, silver, platinum and palladium. Rosland also facilitates establishing precious metal-backed IRAs.

Rosland serves the United States, but has also opened offices in Europe. In July 2014, Rosland expanded into the United Kingdom, where the company is known as Rosland UK, and later moved into Germany as Rosland GmbH.

Rosland's primary product is gold and they argue that while the value of the U.S. dollar drops, gold has long served as a hedge against inflation and has performed well in uncertain economic circumstances.

Rosland Capital's senior economic advisor is Jeffrey Nichols and he often provides commentary for the company on the benefits of including gold in asset portfolios.

Rosland Capital has been endorsed in television commercials and on its website by a variety of well-known figures. Rosland prominently features actor William Devane in its television commercials. Rosland has said it chose Devane because he would resonate with its target demographic. Radio personality G. Gordon Liddy has also appeared in television advertisements for Rosland Capital.

In 2015, Rosland Capital released "The Rosland Capital Guide to Gold", a book penned by Aleksov with John Watson. For each book sold, Rosland Capital said they would make a donation to the American Red Cross.

Partnerships 
In 2016, Rosland Capital was appointed the worldwide distributor for Formula One's limited-edition gold and silver coins that commemorated the circuits of the 2016 FIA Formula One World Championship.

References

Companies based in Santa Monica, California
Precious metals
Financial services companies established in 2008
American companies established in 2008
2008 establishments in California